Luiz Felipe do Nascimento dos Santos (born 9 September 1993), known as Luiz Felipe, is a Brazilian footballer who plays for Santos as a central defender.

Club career

Early career
Luiz Felipe was born in Tubarão, Santa Catarina. A Joinville youth graduate, he joined Caxias in 2011, and made his first team debut on 5 October 2012 by starting in a 1–0 Série C away win against Vila Nova.

On 14 January 2014 Luiz Felipe was loaned to Duque de Caxias, for five months. After serving another subsequent loan at FC Cascavel, he was released.

Paraná
On 3 February 2015 Luiz Felipe signed for Paraná, in Série B. He made his professional debut on 8 May, coming on as a late substitute in a 1–0 home win against Ceará.

On 27 January 2016, after appearing in 28 matches, Luis Felipe renewed his contract until the end of 2017. Two days later he scored his first senior goals, netting a brace in a 4–1 Campeonato Paranaense home routing of J. Malucelli.

Santos

On 17 February 2016, Santos reached an agreement with Paraná for the transfer of Luiz Felipe, with Peixe paying R$ 1 million for 55% of his federative rights. Two days later, he signed a four-year contract with his new club.

Luiz Felipe made his debut for Peixe on 5 March 2016, coming on as a second-half substitute for injured Lucas Veríssimo in a 2–0 home win against rivals Corinthians. He scored his first goal for the club on 28 April, netting the first in a 3–0 Copa do Brasil success against Santos-AP also at the Vila Belmiro.

Luiz Felipe made his Série A debut on 25 May 2016, replacing Joel in a 2–2 away draw against Figueirense as Gustavo Henrique was sent off. He subsequently established himself as a starter, overtaking David Braz and partnering Gustavo, as his club went on to achieve one of the best defensive records during the first half of the campaign.

On 29 October 2016, Luiz Felipe suffered a knee injury in a 1–0 home win against Palmeiras, being sidelined for seven months. He returned to action on 10 September of the following year, replacing injured Gustavo in a 2–0 home win against rivals Corinthians.

On 10 October 2017, Luiz Felipe extended his contract until 2022. A backup to Braz and Veríssimo, he made his Copa Libertadores debut on 1 May of the following year, playing the full 90 minutes in a 1–0 away loss against Nacional as the latter was suspended.

Luiz Felipe spent the 2019 season as a backup to Gustavo and Veríssimo, facing fierce competition from new signings Felipe Aguilar and Luan Peres. On 10 January 2020, he renewed his contract with the club until December 2024.

Career statistics

Honours
Cascavel
Campeonato Paranaense Série Prata: 2014

Santos
Campeonato Paulista: 2016

References

External links
Santos FC profile 

1993 births
Living people
People from Tubarão
Sportspeople from Santa Catarina (state)
Brazilian footballers
Association football defenders
Campeonato Brasileiro Série A players
Campeonato Brasileiro Série B players
Campeonato Brasileiro Série C players
Sociedade Esportiva e Recreativa Caxias do Sul players
Duque de Caxias Futebol Clube players
Paraná Clube players
Santos FC players